Thomas Tsugi was born around the year 1571 in Japan, to a wealthy family of Japanese nobility. Educated by the priests of the Society of Jesus at Arima, he joined the order while quite young, around the year 1588. As a Jesuit, Thomas traveled Japan and became very popular as an eloquent and persuasive preacher.

Thomas was arrested and exiled to Macau because of his publicly practiced faith. Desiring to continue his missionary work in his homeland, he returned to Japan in disguise. Suffering some moments of doubt, however, he gave in to temptations to leave the way of life he held so dear. For one day he did walk away from the order, but returned, zealously resuming his holy missionary work and life of prayer.

The Japanese authorities soon caught up with him and recaptured him. They imprisoned Thomas and sentenced him to death for his bold proclamation of the faith. In 1627 Thomas Tsugi became a martyr as he was burned to death in Nagasaki, Japan — along with several companions. He was heard to proclaim as he died, "Praise the Lord of all nations!"

He is one of the 205 martyrs of Japan beatified by Pope Pius IX in 1867, who are remembered by Japanese Catholics on the 10 September each year.

References

Sources
 Blessed Thomas Tsugi at Patron Saints Index

1571 births
1627 deaths
Japanese Roman Catholics
Japanese beatified people
17th-century venerated Christians
Japanese Jesuits